The Chatos Islands are a group of small islands and rocks lying south of Cape Adriasola, Adelaide Island. The descriptive name Islotes Chatos (flat islands) was given by the Argentine Antarctic Expedition of 1952–53.

See also 
 List of Antarctic and sub-Antarctic islands

References
 

Islands of Adelaide Island